Acacia dura is a shrub of the genus Acacia and the subgenus Plurinerves that is endemic to south western Australia.

Description
Like most species of Acacia it has phyllodes rather than true leaves. The thick rigid grey-green phyllodes have six raised nerves. It blooms in August and produces yellow flowers.

Taxonomy
The species was first formally described by the botanist George Bentham in 1855 as part of the work Plantae Muellerianae: Mimoseae as published in Linnaea: ein Journal für die Botanik in ihrem ganzen Umfange, oder Beiträge zur Pflanzenkunde. It was reclassified as Racosperma durum by Leslie Pedley in 2003 then transferred back to genus Acacia in 2006.
The type specimen was collected by James Drummond.

Distribution
It is native to an area in the Wheatbelt region of Western Australia growing in sandy to sandy-loamy soils often over or around areas of laterite. The distribution of the shrub is limited to a small area
from between Wongan Hills and Piawaning as a part of sandy heathland communities where it is often associated with Melaleuca uncinata.

See also
List of Acacia species

External links

References

dura
Acacias of Western Australia
Taxa named by George Bentham
Plants described in 1855